Kenneth William Daniel Shields,  is a Canadian basketball coach. He holds the most wins in Canadian Interuniversity Sport men's basketball history with the University of Victoria, and is the former head coach of the Canada men's national team.

Personal life
Shields was born in Prince Rupert, British Columbia. He is married to fellow basketball coach Kathy Shields. He attended the University of British Columbia and majored in Physical Education.

Career

Shields coached the Victoria Vikes from 1978 through 1989 and oversaw the Vikes win seven consecutive CIS championships.  He was named CIS Coach of the Year three times with the Vikes and once during the 1970s and his six years as head coach of Laurentian University.

Shields coached the Canadian national team for five years from 1990 to 1994.  In 1998, he was made a Member of the Order of Canada and the following year he was inducted into the Canadian Basketball Hall of Fame. In 2002, he was inducted into the UVic Sports Hall of Fame and later awarded the 2007 James Naismith Award by Canada Basketball, for a significant lifelong contribution to basketball in Canada. After coaching two years for professional teams in Tokyo, Shields was assistant coach of the Australian national team for the 2004 Olympics.  During the 2006 NBA play-offs, Shields worked as guest coaching consultant of the Milwaukee Bucks.

In 2009, Shields was inducted into the Canada Sports Hall of Fame. In 2019, he was inducted into the Canada West Hall Of Fame.

References

Year of birth missing (living people)
Living people
Canadian basketball coaches
Laurentian University people
Members of the Order of Canada
University of Victoria
Sportspeople from Greater Sudbury
U Sports coaches
People from Prince Rupert, British Columbia
Basketball people from British Columbia
Basketball people from Ontario